The 1992 Somalia famine was a result of devastation inflicted by warring factions in southern Somalia, primarily the Somali National Front, which ravaged grain stores in the fertile inter-riverine agricultural belt around the Jubba and Shebelle rivers. The resulting famine primarily affected residents living along the Jubba/Shebelle riverine area and the internally displaced.

By the second half of 1992, the famine began to recede, partly due to the lull in fighting, which allowed the first crop harvest in the Lower Shebelle region, and also due to large-scale international food deliveries. The continuing crisis led to the creation of UNOSOM I in April 1992. In December 1992 the UNITAF was created to replace UNOSOM I and deployed to Somalia with the objective of providing security for relief groups. 

The famine largely subsided by March 1993 and UNITAF would transition to UNOSOM II. The crisis resulted in an estimated 200,000-300,000 deaths.

Causes and contributing factors 

The largest contributing factor behind the famine was the devastation inflicted by warring factions in southern Somalia. After President Siad Barre had been ejected from Mogadishu by Aidids forces in January 1991 his faction, the Somali National Front (SNF), withdrew far south of the city into Somalia's fertile breadbasket.

Lacking supplies of their own, the Barres forces ravaged the grain stores of inter-riverine agricultural belt around the Jubba and Shebelle rivers. The SNF is generally considered to bear primary responsibility for inducing the famine. This dire food supply situation was further exacerbated by fighting between the SNF and rebels, the most powerful of which was the Somali Liberation Army (an anti-Barre rebel coalition preceding the Somali National Alliance) led by General Mohamed Farah Aidid. According to John Drysdale:"The famine was a combination of drought and a seven-month military occupation of the area by three divisions of Siad Barre’s army. The former president had moved his headquarters from the Gedo region to Baidoa on September 15, 1991, to prepare for a military reoccupation of Mogadishu seven months later. Meanwhile, his soldiers plundered grain stores in this agricultural area, destroying pumps and implements in their wake. Farming came to a standstill. Barre’s army of occupation did not leave the area until April 22, 1992. On the road to Wanle Weyn it suffered its initial defeat at Aideed’s hands before retreating rapidly to the Kenya border. Its seven- month occupation left villages upon villages of destitute farming communities. It took three months for the impact of growing mass starvation to hit the world’s television screens."

Famine 
As agricultural production ceased, food prices skyrocketed in mid-1991. In November later that year major battles in Mogadishu and Kismayo closed the main ports. This led to the near disappearance of food from many markets across southern Somalia.

The famine was highly selective and affected primarily two groups - the inhabitants along the Jubba/Shebelle riverine area and internally displaced people, primarily in the Bay region. According to a Red Cross nutritional surveys carried out in July 1991, pastoralists and townspeople had near normal levels of nutrition while farmers along the rivers and those displaced in camps outside settlements by fighting were severely malnourished. Baidoa, capital of Bay region, would become an epicenter of the famine and was referred to at the time as the "City of Death". During the first year the vast majority of aid distributed to the needy was from local community initiatives. Village committees, often centered around Mosques, established feeding centers and relief associations.

A principle killer during the famine were epidemic diseases such as measles and malaria.

Aid worker and journalist Micheal Maren reported that the UN claimed that 4.5 million people in Somalia (the vast majority of the countries population) were facing starvation in order to provoke an international response, even though it was evident to those working on the ground in the afflicted regions that the famine was highly localized and most Somalis were relatively unaffected. According to UNOSOM advisor John Drysdale, media portrayals of the crisis being nationwide were devoid of reality as only about 12% of the population had been affected by the famine.

Famine Recedes 
During the second half of 1992 the famine largely began to recede. 

Food prices across the country dropped dramatically from July to September 1992. The primary reason was that the lull in fighting in the south had allowed the first crop harvest in the Lower Shebelle region, which had proved to be surprisingly bountiful.

By the time most international media had taken notice in the famine, the peak in mortality had largely already passed, though pockets of starvation in Baidoa and Bardheere in September would lead to the apex of the famine with approximately 30,000 people dying that month. Soon after, weekly death rates in the city of Baidoa had dropped from 1,700 in September to 300 by mid-November 1992.

In the view of UNOSOM advisor John Drysdale, the UN Secretary-Generals claim that starvation was a direct result of continuing insecurity in Somalia during late 1992 was, "...dubious in the extreme".

International Aid 

The second important factor in the suppression of starvation was large scale international food deliveries. In May 1992 the first UN aid shipment arrived in Mogadishu. The International Committee of the Red Cross (ICRC) would distribute 75% of all food aid coming into Somalia, and managed the majority of all US based aid. The organization operated 400 kitchens across the country. It is believed that at its peak the ICRC provided some form of relief to over 2 million Somalis. For its efforts the ICRC was nominated for the Nobel Peace Prize.

UNOSOM I 
In April 1992 UNOSOM I was to established to respond to the famine. According to an estimate made in November 1994 by the Washington-based Refugee Policy Group NGO, approximately 100,000 lives were saved as a result of international assistance during the famine. US airlifts that had begun in August 1992 and gone on until December has credited with saving around 40,000 of those lives. Head of UNOSOM in Somalia, Mohamed Sahnoun, would later criticize aid agencies for overwhelmingly focusing on Mogadishu when starvation in the country was elsewhere.

Operation Restore Hope and UNITAF 
According to the Refugee Policy Group NGO, approximately 10,000 of the 100,000 saved by foreign aid had been rescued following the deployment of U.S. and international troops during December 1992's Operation Restore Hope. US government commissioned report aligns with these figures claiming an estimated 10,000-25,000 saved following the December 1992 intervention.

By early 1993 food prices had fallen well below production costs and farmers in the riverine areas would report grain stores full from previous unsold harvests. Despite the significant improvement in mortality due to the resumption of argricultal production and international aid, death rates in southern Somalia were still above normal.

Estimates of looting 
Estimates of the amount of food aid looted greatly vary, ranging from 10-80%.

The ICRC claimed that 10-15% of food aid deliveries were "unaccounted losses" which were often conflated with looting. Professor Alex de Waal claims this was an optimistic assessment and that the number was likely higher, but notes that much of what was counted in the figure was not hijackings or robberies. A significant portion of the food considered under the umbrella of an "unaccounted loss" was actually given up through agreements between the ICRC and its 24,000 employees/subcontractors in Somalia, who were usually paid in food. When food was stolen it was often through non-violent means such as the registration of "ghost kitchens" or "ghost villages" that did not actually exist.

At its peak, the maximum figure of looting was somewhere under 50% of aid and according to the Red Cross, the majority eventually reached its intended destination. In October 1992 United Nations Special Representative to Somalia Mohamed Sahnoun estimated that the majority of deliveries had around 15% looted, but that the number increased to as much as 40% of higher quality items. In an interview with American war correspondent Scott Peterson Sahnoun would comment on looting by militias stating, "We see that there is a limit to the authority of Aidid and others, though they do not want to confess their inability to control, their powerlessness,"

Some UN World Food Programme officials went as far to claim that 80% of all food aid shipments were being looted, a figure that has been heavily disputed. This number was later used by President George H.W. Bush to justify the deployment of US troops to Somalia in December 1992. The estimate was directly disputed by Pakistani Brigadier-General Imtiaz Shaheen (head of the first UN troop contingent to Somalia) in an interview with British journalist Mark Huband as Operation Restore Hope began in Mogadishu. General Shaheen claimed that the amount of aid being looted was being exaggerated in order justify expanding the scope of the operation and that estimates of 80% were completely fabricated.

Death Toll 
The figure of those who died during the 1992 Somalia famine is more difficult to estimate than with most famines, largely due to the highly uneven impact of starvation and mass displacement from the civil war.

According to the BBC 220,000 Somalis died during the 1992 famine. This figure was reportedly surpassed by approximately 40,000 during the 2011 East Africa drought.

References

Citations

Sources

Further reading 

Somali Civil War
1992 in Somalia
20th century in Mogadishu
1992 in Africa